The Charm Beneath (Traditional Chinese: 胭脂水粉) is a TVB period drama series broadcast in October 2005. The series was shown to celebrate TVB's 38th Anniversary.

Sheren Tang and Bobby Au-Yeung were originally cast in this series instead of Gigi Lai and Moses Chan when the teaser trailer premiered in the TVB sales presentation in 2005.

Synopsis
They hide a dagger in a smile,
Are they driven by desire for power,
Or is it their only way to survive?

Cast

The Chuk family

The Ng family

The Wang family

Reception 
With the grand production title and boasted a very impressive casts, TVB Had spent the amount of money and highly promotion into the production, likely to granted out Anniversary Series as well as set out to create a 1930s version of successful's War and Beauty but returned the disappoint rating then they been expected due to the various of reason about viewers' taste and the way the drama portray different so far from War's Darken plot, making the grand production which failed. Began with 27 average point and minor growth in the following, praised the cast and producer an unhopeful high rating already. The Drama ended up with a bit better result with 32 average point with highest peak at 36 although it still couldn't compare to War and Beauty's final rating.

Despite the loss in the terms of rating, The Charm Beneath pressed out with a majority of positive reviews, began critical acclaims. one of the Outstanding drama of 2005 already considered in some reviews, deemed it classics. The Drama had memorable with Anne Heung's villain. Other began with cast's Disturbing acting and well script. Its theme song also recognized well into its story line with the quiet but breathtaking sound. After all, The Drama garner enough for two female nomination at TVB's 38th Anniversary award with Gigi Lai for Best Actress and Kiki Sheung for Best Supporting actress.

Viewership ratings

References

External links
TVB.com The Charm Beneath - Official Website 

TVB dramas
2005 Hong Kong television series debuts
2005 Hong Kong television series endings